Violet Rose Olney (later Parish; 22 May 1911 – 3 January 1999) was an English athlete from Southwark, London, who mainly competed in the 100 metres. She competed for Great Britain at the 1936 Summer Olympics held in Berlin, Germany where she won the silver medal in the women's 4 x 100 metres with her teammates Eileen Hiscock, Audrey Brown and Barbara Burke.

References

Profile

1911 births
1999 deaths
English female sprinters
Olympic athletes of Great Britain
Athletes (track and field) at the 1936 Summer Olympics
Olympic silver medallists for Great Britain
Place of birth missing
Medalists at the 1936 Summer Olympics
Olympic silver medalists in athletics (track and field)
Olympic female sprinters